Yeo Hyun-soo (born September 21, 1982) is a South Korean actor.

Filmography

Film

Television series

Variety show

Awards

References

External links 
  
 
 
 

1982 births
Living people
South Korean male film actors
South Korean male television actors
South Korean male child actors
20th-century South Korean male actors
21st-century South Korean male actors
Place of birth missing (living people)
Best New Actor Paeksang Arts Award (film) winners